At least three ships of the Hellenic Navy have borne the name Aspis ("Shield"):

 , built in 1877 by Yarrow & Company at Poplar, London.
 , a  launched in 1906 and stricken in 1945.
 , a  launched in 1942 as USS Conner she was transferred to Greece in 1959 and renamed. She was scrapped in 1997.

See also
 , a Greek cargo ship in service 1960–1963, formerly known as SS Empire Baffin, built in 1941.

Hellenic Navy ship names